The Speed of Life is an American drama film, directed by Ed Radtke and released in 2007. The film stars Jeremy Allen White as Sammer, a bored teenager in New York City who steals video cameras from tourists and retreats into fantasies based on the footage he finds on them.

The film premiered on August 30, 2007 at the 64th Venice International Film Festival, where it won the Queer Lion award for best LGBTQ-related film at the festival.

References

External links
 

2007 comedy films
2007 films
2007 LGBT-related films
American drama films
American LGBT-related films
LGBT-related drama films
2000s English-language films
2000s American films